Employment Promotion and Protection against Unemployment Convention, 1988 is  an International Labour Organization Convention to promote employment especially vocational guidance, training and rehabilitation, offer the best protection against the adverse effects of involuntary unemployment, but that involuntary unemployment nevertheless exists and that it is therefore important to ensure the social security systems should promote employment assistance and economic support to those who are involuntary unemployed.

It was established in 1988, with the preamble stating:
Having decided upon the adoption of certain proposals with regard to employment promotion and social security which is the fifth item on the agenda of the session with a view, in particular, to revising the Unemployment Provision Convention, 1934, and
Emphasising the importance of work and productive employment in any society not only because of the resources which they create for the community, but also because of income which they bring towards the social role which they confer and feeling of self-esteem which workers derive from them, and...

Ratifications 
As of 2013, Albania, Belgium, Brazil, Finland, Norway, Romania, Sweden, and Switzerland had ratified the convention.

References

External links 
Text.
Ratifications.

Unemployment
International Labour Organization conventions
Treaties concluded in 1988
Treaties entered into force in 1991
Treaties of Albania
Treaties of Belgium
Treaties of Brazil
Treaties of Finland
Treaties of Norway
Treaties of Romania
Treaties of Sweden
Treaties of Switzerland
1988 in labor relations